Arbella Insurance Group  is a regional property and casualty insurance company headquartered in Quincy, Massachusetts. It provides business and personal insurance in Massachusetts and Connecticut, as well as business insurance in Rhode Island and New Hampshire.

History

In 1988, Kemper Insurance Group announced its intentions to withdraw from the Massachusetts auto market. A key piece of legislation was needed to make the company solvent in the Massachusetts market, and within 30 days, the key piece of legislation needed to form Arbella passed.

In 2008, the Massachusetts Commissioner of Insurance decided to “discontinue the practice of state-set rates for private passenger auto insurance and allow insurers to propose rates.” A monumental occurrence for Massachusetts insurers, this decision came after the ill-fated 1977 attempt to allow full competition in the private passenger auto market.

John Donohue, President and CEO of Arbella, spoke about how his company would fare in this new climate of competition. He reported that Arbella was “not only ready to adapt, but also to succeed and prosper in this new business environment.”

Current Operations

Since its conception, Arbella Insurance Group has used the independent agent model. This is opposed to several national insurance companies known as “direct writers,” who allow prospective customers to receive a quote instantly online, and to then purchase their insurance policies the same way. The firm serves as a carrier, partnering with independent insurance agencies throughout New England to write lines of commercial and personal insurance offers for its customers.

Charitable contributions

The Arbella Insurance Foundation was founded in 2005 to support nonprofit organizations that have a significant, impact on the people and communities served by the Arbella Insurance Group. It supports organizations working in culture and education, health and wellness, hunger and homelessness, inclusion and incorporation, safe driving, youth and families, and social justice.

Founders
John Donohue
Frank Bellotti
John J Mooney
President and COO from 1988-1994

References

Insurance companies based in Massachusetts
Insurance companies of the United States
Companies based in Massachusetts
American companies established in 1988
Financial services companies established in 1988
Financial services companies of the United States
1988 establishments in Massachusetts
1988 establishments in the United States
Companies established in 1988